John Ireland (1882–1965) was a British philatelist who was added to the Roll of Distinguished Philatelists in 1956.

References

Signatories to the Roll of Distinguished Philatelists
1882 births
1965 deaths
British philatelists